Edmund Scientific Corporation, based in Barrington, New Jersey, was founded in 1942 as a retailer of surplus optical parts like lenses. It later branched out into complete systems like telescopes and microscopes, and in the 1960s, a wide variety of science toys and kits. Through the 1970s and 80s they were best known for their mail order sales and associated catalogs, although they also maintained a retail presence at their factory store.

In 1984, the company split into Edmund Scientific and Edmund Industrial Optics, the latter taking over their optical manufacturing. Later known simply as Edmund Optics, the commercial side of the company continued to expand and now has a multinational presence. In 2001, the two companies were purchased by Boreal Science, which was in turn purchased by VWR International. Many of the science toys and kits are currently offered by the online retailer Scientifics Direct.

Among the company's best-known products were the Astroscan reflector telescope and their inexpensive bimetallic jumping disks.

History

Origins
In 1942, amateur photographer Norman W. Edmund (1916–2012) found it hard to find lenses he needed for his hobby. He found that the military was happy to sell off less-than-perfect optics for next to nothing and began using these. Buying in bulk, he began to sell his own surplus through advertisements in photography magazines. It was so successful he founded "'Edmund Salvage Corporation'" in 1942. Working from a card table in his home, the company soon had so much stock that they had to rent space in more than 30 separate garages.

Post-war

The business continued in the post-war era and owned so much stock that when the Korean War started the military came to him for the optics needed to repair war-era systems. One official told him, "Gee, you have more optics than the Army!" In 1948 they completed a new building and warehouse in Barrington and opened a retail store at the front. Among its displays was a complete periscope from a WWII Japanese submarine. The core of the company in this era remained surplus lenses. These were single-element lenses, shipped in  coin envelopes, with the approximate diameter and focal length stenciled on them. Reflecting their salvage and surplus origins, available diameters and focal lengths did not fall into regular progressions. 

In addition to optics, the company soon branched out into various kits and plans for optics-related systems like telescopes and microscopes. It soon changed its name to Edmund Scientific and made its name with ads in publications like Scientific American. Its advertisements caught the attention of hobbyists, amateur astronomers, high school students, and cash-strapped researchers.  The company also began publishing a series of pamphlets on telescopes in a do-it-yourself fashion that was popular in contemporary magazines like Popular Mechanics. These were later collected into book form in 1967, "All About Telescopes", which contained many plans for telescope systems that became a best seller and was republished repeatedly into the 1980s.

Heyday

Following Sputnik, Edmund was able to capitalize on a growing national interest in science and astronomy. They expanded their business into a full line of telescopes and telescope kits as well as equipment, parts, and supplies for other scientific fields such as physics, optics, chemistry, microscopy, electronics, and meteorology. They continued to grow as a supplier to teachers and schools with demonstration devices and kits which covered most fields of science.

Edmund's catered to the 1960s generation by expanding and highlighting their line of projectors, color wheels, black lights, filters, and other optical devices which could be used by rock bands and in psychedelic light shows. Other items catering to the counterculture were eventually added to the catalog covering the fields of Biofeedback, ESP, Kirlian photography, Pyramid power, and alternative energy.

In 1971, in the Whole Earth Catalog of items "relevant to independent education", Stewart Brand noted: "Edmund is the best source we know of for low-cost scientific gadgetry (including math and optics gear). [In this category,] many of the items we found independently... turned up in the Edmund catalog, so we were obliged to recommend that in this area we've been precluded."

The company became briefly famous in 1973 when Comet Kohoutek approached Earth and the company sold out of telescopes, a fact that made national news. Neil deGrasse Tyson would later comment that "The Edmund Scientific catalog was a geek's paradise. At a time when no one had access to lasers, they had them for sale."

Some sources claim that certain of the original polyhedral dice used in the Dungeons & Dragons role-playing game system were obtained from Edmund Scientific.

Restructuring
Norman retired in 1975 and left the company to his son, Robert. The company continued on as before into the 1980s, but the original business model began to wane. Robert split the company into Edmund Scientifics and Edmund Optics. Edmund Scientifics marketed to consumers and specialized in science-themed toys, vaguely high-tech household gadgets, and "science gifts." Edmund Optics did not have a public showroom like Edmund Scientifics, although the two organizations shared the same building. The large back room of Edmund Scientifics still sold military surplus from World War II and other wars well into the 1980s and into the mid-1990s. Some of the items in the surplus room were from German and other non-American militaries. None of these items were in the mail-order catalogs. They also sold other surplus wares of interest to hobbyists, including specialized motors and other miscellaneous electronics, parts from toys, and other household items.

Acquisition
In 2000 Edmund Scientific was purchased by Science Kit and Boreal Laboratories, a western New York based science supply company. Science Kit and Boreal Laboratories is part of a group of companies that provide science supplies to elementary, middle, and high schools, as well as colleges and universities. This group falls under the unofficial umbrella "VWR Education", and its constituent enterprises are owned by VWR International, a multi-national conglomerate with offices in India, China, Europe, Canada, and the United States. They are no longer affiliated with Edmund Optics Inc.

Beginning in 2000, Edmund Optics offered a variety of experimental grade and stock clearance items via a print catalog and online under a separate business named Anchor Optics, but this operation ceased in 2016, and the current Anchor Optics web site now redirects to a page at Edmund Optics listing clearance items.

In 2001, the Barrington, New Jersey, store closed after Edmund Scientific was acquired by Science Kit and Boreal Laboratories.

As of 2009, online sales made up the bulk of Edmund Scientific's revenues. The company was still selling telescopes (including an updated version of their Astroscan Telescope), microscopes (mostly they have carried the Boreal brand, manufactured for their parent company Science Kit LLC), surplus optics, magnets, and Fresnel lenses. They continued to sell many of their old favorites along with new items such as the Impossiball and hand boilers as well as other science-themed toys, novelty items, gifts, and gadgets.

As of 2017, Edmund Optics continued to offer brand-new stock optics, as well as offering custom and specialized optics to corporations and higher education institutions.

In popular culture 
Edmund Scientific has provided items used in television shows such as House, MythBusters, 24, Modern Marvels, and motion pictures such as Star Trek, and the 1975 version of Escape to Witch Mountain. Wah Chang, the artist who designed and built several props in the 1960s for the Star Trek television show, used moiré patterns found in the Edmund Scientific Educator's and Designer's Moiré Kit for the texture used in the Starfleet communicator props.

In the Simpsons episode "Two Bad Neighbors", Bart Simpson releases locusts from a box labeled Edmund Scientific.

See also
 Astroscan, a wide-field Newtonian reflector telescope produced by the Edmund Scientific Corporation.

References

Bibliography
 Preface to Edmund Scientific Catalog 751 Copyright 1974, Edmund Scientific Co.

External links
 https://www.edmundscientific.com/ [Broken  link]
www.edmundoptics.com — Edmund Optics professional optics company
www.scientificsonline.com — Edmund Scientifics science supplies and gifts company

Companies based in Camden County, New Jersey
Mail-order retailers
Surplus stores
Telescope manufacturers
Barrington, New Jersey